A carbuncle is a cluster of boils caused by bacterial infection, most commonly with Staphylococcus aureus or Streptococcus pyogenes.  The presence of a carbuncle is a sign that the immune system is active and fighting the infection. The infection is contagious and may spread to other areas of the body, or other people; those living in the same residence may develop carbuncles at the same time. In the early 21st century, infection involving methicillin-resistant Staphylococcus aureus (MRSA) has become more common.

Signs and symptoms
A carbuncle is a cluster of several boils, which is typically filled with purulent exudate (dead neutrophils, phagocytized bacteria, and other cellular components).  Fluid may drain freely from the carbuncle, or intervention involving an incision and drainage procedure may be needed. Carbuncles may develop anywhere, but they are most common on the back and the nape of the neck.

A carbuncle is palpable and can range in size to be as small as a pea or as large as a golf ball.  The surrounding area is indurated. Later, skin on the centre of the carbuncle softens and peripheral satellite vesicles appear; these rupture, discharging pus, and give rise to cribriform appearance.  As the impending infection develops, itching may occur. There may be localized erythema or skin irritation, and the area may be painful when touched.  Sometimes more severe symptoms may occur, such as fatigue, fever, chills, and general malaise as the body fights the infection.

Cause
The initial cause of a carbuncle can often not be determined. Triggers that make carbuncle infections more likely include recent incidence of folliculitis; friction from clothing or shaving; having hair pulled out, such as sites where clothing or furniture grab at hairs; generally poor hygiene; poor nutrition; or weakened immunity. Poor health may be a predisposing factor – for example, persons with diabetes and immune system diseases are more likely to develop infections (especially bacterial infections of the leg or foot).

Society and culture

Etymology
The word is believed to have originated from the Latin: carbunculus, originally a small coal; diminutive of carbon-, carbo: charcoal or ember, but also a carbuncle stone, "precious stones of a red or fiery colour", usually garnets.

Metaphor: the "monstrous carbuncle"
In 1984 Charles III, then Prince of Wales, described the proposed Sainsbury Wing extension to the National Gallery in London as a "monstrous carbuncle on the face of a much-loved and elegant friend", a term he has used since to describe other pieces of architecture.

References

Gross pathology

ca:Àntrax
pl:Czyrak